Petrovsky Boulevard,, is a major boulevard in Moscow. It begins at the Petrovsky Gates Square (Petrovka Street) and ends at Trubnaya Square, completing the link of Boulevard Ring between Strastnoy Boulevard and Rozhdestvensky Boulevard.

The boulevard (as well as Petrovka Street and Petrovsky Gates) is named after Vysoko-Petrovsky Monastery. Apart from the monastery, there is still a fairly high (but shrinking) share of genuine 19th century buildings.

Gallery

Boulevards in Moscow
Cultural heritage monuments of regional significance in Moscow